Duchy of Racibórz was one of the duchies of Silesia. Its capital was Racibórz in Upper Silesia.

History
After Bolesław I the Tall and his younger brother Mieszko I Tanglefoot backed by Emperor Frederick I Barbarossa had retained their Silesian heritage in 1163, the Duchy of Racibórz was formed in 1172 as a territory for Mieszko. It was centered on the towns of Racibórz, Koźle and Cieszyn. Mieszko's small share was enlarged the first time in 1177, when he received the territories of Bytom, Oświęcim, Zator, Pszczyna and Siewierz from his uncle High Duke Casimir II the Just of Poland. In 1202 Mieszko occupied the Duchy of Opole of his deceased nephew Jarosław, forming the united Duchy of Opole and Racibórz.

After the death of Mieszko's grandson Duke Władysław Opolski in 1281, his sons again divided the Duchy of Opole and Racibórz and in 1290 the Duchy of Racibórz was recreated again, assigned to Władysław's youngest son Przemysław. Racibórz at that time comprised the lands of Wodzisław, Żory, Rybnik, Mikołów and Pszczyna, while some of the territory of was used for the creation of the duchies of Cieszyn and Bytom under Przemysław's brothers.

In 1327 Przemysław's son Duke Leszek paid homage to King John of Bohemia, whereafter his duchy became a Bohemian fief. After Leszek died without issue in 1336, King John seized the duchy and granted it to the Přemyslid Duke Nicolas II of Opava (Troppau), forming the united Duchy of Opava and Racibórz. The Duchy would suffer several territorial changes until in 1521 it was again merged with Opole under Duke Jan II the Good. As a Duchy of Opole and Racibórz, after Jan's death in 1532 it fell back to the House of Habsburg, Bohemian kings since 1526. The fief was given in pawn to Margrave George of Brandenburg-Ansbach from the House of Hohenzollern, later briefly to the Polish House of Vasa and finally would be annexed and incorporated into the Kingdom of Prussia by the 1742 Treaty of Breslau.

The title of a "Duke of Ratibor" was acquired by Landgrave Victor Amadeus of Hesse-Rotenburg in 1821. King Frederick William IV of Prussia in 1840 granted it to the landgrave's nephew Prince Victor of Hohenlohe-Schillingsfürst, in turn for his renunciation of the Hohenlohe inheritance in favour of his younger brother Chlodwig.

Dukes

Silesian Piasts
Mieszko I Tanglefoot (1172–1211)
United with Opole from 1202.
Casimir I of Opole (1211–1230), son, under the tutelage of Duke Henry I the Bearded until 1238
Mieszko II the Fat (1230–1246), son
Władysław of Opole (1246–1281), brother
Split off Opole, Cieszyn and Bytom.
Mieszko of Cieszyn (1281–1290), son of Władysław, Duke of Cieszyn in 1290, jointly with his brother
Przemysław (1281–1306)
Leszek (1306–1336), son of Przemysław, died without issue
Line extinct, duchy seized as a reverted fief by King John of Bohemia.

Přemyslid dukes of Opava
Nicholas II (1337–1365)
John I (1365–1378), son, also Duke of Krnov from 1377
John II (1378–1424), son
Nicholas V (1424–1437), son, jointly with his brother
Wenceslaus (1424–1456)
John III (1456–1493), son of Wenceslaus
Nicholas VI (1493–1506), son, jointly with his brothers
John IV (1493–1506)
Valentin (1493–1521)
Line extinct, duchy inherited by Duke Jan II the Good of Opole.

House of Hohenlohe-Schillingfürst 

 Dukes of Ratibor and Princes of CorveyVictor I Moritz Carl (1840–1893)
Victor II Amadeus (1893–1919)Heads of the House of Ratibor after World War I'Victor II Amadeus (1919–1923)
Victor III August Maria (1923–1945)
Franz-Albrecht Metternich-Sándor (1945–2009)
Victor IV (since 2009)

Bibliography
ŽÁČEK, Rudolf. Dějiny Slezska v datech''. Praha : Libri, 2003. .

References

See also
 Duke of Opole
 Dukes of Silesia

12th-century establishments in Poland
Duchies of Silesia
States and territories established in 1172
History of Lesser Poland Voivodeship
History of Silesian Voivodeship